Sri Sultan Hamengkubuwono VI (10 August 1821 – 20 July 1877), also spelled Hamengkubuwana VI, was the sixth Sultan of Yogyakarta of the Yogyakarta Sultanate, who reigned from 1855 until 1877. He succeeded his older brother, Hamengkubuwono V, who died in the midst of political instability within the Yogyakarta Palace.

Notes

Sultans of Yogyakarta
Burials at Imogiri
1821 births
1877 deaths
Indonesian royalty